Group C of the 2022 FIFA World Cup took place from 22 to 30 November 2022. The group consisted of the national association football teams of Argentina, Saudi Arabia, Mexico and Poland. The top two teams, Argentina and Poland, advanced to the round of 16. This marked the first time that Mexico did not advance past the first round since 1978.

Teams
The teams were decided by the World Cup draw that took place on 1 April 2022. The group was set to receive one team from each pot, which sorted all World Cup teams by position on the FIFA World Rankings.

Notes

Summary
The first match of the group was between Argentina and Saudi Arabia. The two teams had faced each other four times prior to the tournament, most recently in 2012, a 0–0 draw in a friendly game, though Argentina beat Saudi Arabia 3–1 back in the 1992 King Fahd Cup and 2–0 in 1988.
Saudi Arabia defeated Argentina and ended their 36-match unbeaten streak. According to Gracenote, the win was the "most surprising" in World Cup history, with many calling it one of the biggest World Cup upsets in history.
This was also the second consecutive time that Argentina did not win their opening match at a World Cup, after drawing 1–1 with Iceland in 2018; and the first time since 1990 that Argentina lost their opening match. Argentina had taken the lead in the 10th minute with a penalty from Lionel Messi, awarded for a foul on Leandro Paredes, which he rolled into the left corner. They also had three goals ruled out for offside. Saudi Arabia equalized in the 48th minute with a low shot to the right corner from Saleh Al-Shehri. They took the lead five minutes later when Salem Al-Dawsari curled the ball into the right corner of the net from just inside the penalty area.

The second match was held between Mexico and Poland. They had met eight times previously including once in the World Cup, in Poland's 3–1 first group stage victory in 1978, and most recently in 2017 in a 1–0 win for Mexico in a friendly. The only shot on target of the first half was from Jorge Sánchez, which was punched away by goalkeeper Wojciech Szczęsny. In the 54th minute, Poland captain Robert Lewandowski was awarded a penalty after the Video Assistant Referee judged that Héctor Moreno had fouled the Poland captain inside the penalty area. Guillermo Ochoa saved the penalty taken by Lewandowski, diving to his left, and the game stayed goalless. At the other end of the field, Mexico had a chance to win the game as a ball into the penalty area from Edson Álvarez went towards Henry Martín who attempted to head the ball beyond Szczęsny; however, the Poland goalkeeper managed to beat the ball away. Poland failed to win their opening game in a World Cup for the eighth time, having won just one of their nine opening World Cup games, though for the first time since 1986, they did not lose the opening game of a World Cup.

Poland and Saudi Arabia had faced each other four times prior to the tournament most recently in 2006, a 2–1 win for Poland in a friendly game. Piotr Zieliński scored the opening goal for Poland in the 39th minute. At the end of the first half, Saleh Al-Shehri was fouled in the box and was awarded a penalty kick. However, Salem Al-Dawsari attempt was saved by Wojciech Szczęsny in the first minute of stoppage time. In the second half, an error by Abdulellah Al-Malki led to Robert Lewandowski scoring his first World Cup goal in the 82nd minute as Saudi Arabia was defeated by Poland 2–0. The result meant that Poland did not lose their two opening World Cup games for the first time since 1986.

Argentina and Mexico had played at FIFA World Cups three times. Argentina had won all three: 6–3 group stage victory in 1930, 2–1 round of 16 win in 2006 and another round of 16 victory by 3–1 in 2010. After a goalless first half, Messi put Argentina into the lead in the 64th minute. Enzo Fernández made it 2–0 and secured the win in the 87th minute with a curled finish to the right corner of the net.

The third matchday encounter between Poland and Argentina was the third time the two nations met in a FIFA World Cup. Wojciech Szczęsny made a penalty save in the first half to deny Lionel Messi, only to concede twice for the first time in this FIFA World Cup, when Argentina scored two goals in the second half, the first by Alexis Mac Allister with a low shot to the left corner and the second from Julián Álvarez with a shot to the top right corner as the Argentines won 2–0, topping the group with two wins.
Despite this, Poland would eventually join Argentina in the last sixteen thanks to a superior goal difference than Mexico, ending their 36 years knockout stage drought.

Saudi Arabia and Mexico had met five previous times, most recently in 1999, a 5–1 win for Mexico at the 1999 FIFA Confederations Cup. After a goalless first half, Mexico struck twice in the second half, first with a volley from a corner kick by Henry Martín in the 47th minute and then with a thunderous free kick by Luis Chávez in the 52nd minute, eliminating the Saudis. However, Mexico failed to find a third goal, which they needed to overtake Poland on goal difference – Mexico had received more yellow cards than Poland and would have been eliminated on this basis if the teams finished level on points, goal difference, and goals scored. Salem Al-Dawsari, however, scored in the  5th minute of added time with a goal after a one-two, eliminating Mexico as they claimed the 2–1 win. This result also meant Mexico failed to advance to the knockout stage for the first time since 1978 and the first time Mexico failed to do so in the 21st century, while Saudi Arabia's knockout stage drought extended to 32 years, having failed to advance past the group stage for the fifth consecutive World Cup, with the country's debut in 1994 remains Saudi Arabia's only successful performance.

Standings

In the round of 16:
 The winners of Group C, Argentina, advanced to play the runners-up of Group D, Australia.
 The runners-up of Group C, Poland, advanced to play the winners of Group D, France.

Matches
All times listed are local, AST (UTC+3).

Argentina vs Saudi Arabia

Mexico vs Poland

Poland vs Saudi Arabia
The two teams had faced each other four times, most recently in 2006, a 2–1 win for Poland in a friendly game.

The win against Saudi Arabia marked the first time that Poland avoided defeat in their opening two World Cup matches since 1986, having previously failed to do so in 2002, 2006 and 2018.

Argentina vs Mexico

Poland vs Argentina

Saudi Arabia vs Mexico
Mexico failed to advance to the second round of the FIFA World Cup for the first time since 1978.

Discipline
Fair play points would have been used as tiebreakers if the overall and head-to-head records of teams were tied. These were calculated based on yellow and red cards received in all group matches as follows:
first yellow card: −1 point;
indirect red card (second yellow card): −3 points;
direct red card: −4 points;
yellow card and direct red card: −5 points;

Only one of the above deductions was applied to a player in a single match.

Notes

References

External links

 

2022 FIFA World Cup
Argentina at the 2022 FIFA World Cup
Saudi Arabia at the 2022 FIFA World Cup
Mexico at the 2022 FIFA World Cup
Poland at the 2022 FIFA World Cup